Mouna Hannachi is a Tunisian football former player and current manager. Nicknamed Manino, she played as a defender and has represented the Tunisia women's national team.

Club career
Hannachi has played for AS Banque de l’Habitat in Tunisia.

International career
Hannachi has capped for Tunisia at senior level, including a 0–4 friendly loss to Algeria on 23 June 2009.

International goals
Scores and results list Tunisia goal tally first

See also
List of Tunisia women's international footballers

References

External links

Year of birth missing (living people)
Living people
Footballers from Tunis
Tunisian women's footballers
Women's association football defenders
Tunisia women's international footballers
Emirati women's footballers
United Arab Emirates women's international footballers
Dual internationalists (women's football)
Tunisian football managers
Women's association football managers
Female association football managers
Tunisian expatriate football managers
Tunisian expatriate sportspeople in Oman
Expatriate football managers in Oman